The 2008 Allstate Sugar Bowl was an American college football bowl game. It was part of the Bowl Championship Series (BCS) for the 2007 NCAA Division I FBS football season, and was the 74th Sugar Bowl.  It was played on January 1, 2008, in the Louisiana Superdome in New Orleans.

Because the SEC champion (LSU) was slated to participate in the BCS National Championship Game, the number-five Georgia Bulldogs were selected to host the number-ten, WAC champion Hawaii Warriors, the last undefeated major college football team going into the bowl season.

The Warriors were the third team not in any of the six BCS conferences (not counting major independent Notre Dame) to play in a BCS game. Boise State qualified for the 2007 Fiesta Bowl, and Utah made the same game two years earlier.  Both teams won their respective games.

Georgia earned a 41–10 win. It was already a one-sided affair at halftime with a 24–3 score and it was 41–3 at one point early in the fourth quarter. The closest Hawaii got was 7–3 after a Dan Kelly field goal.

Scoring summary

Pre-game
Hawaii wins the toss, selects to receive.

First Quarter
UGA Touchdown, by Knowshon Moreno, rush for 17 yards. Brandon Coutu makes PAT. (9:49) 7-0 UGA
UH Field goal, by Dan Kelly, 42 yards. (4:26) 7-3 UGA
UGA Touchdown, by Moreno, rush for 11 yards. Coutu makes PAT. (1:02) 14-3 UGA

Second Quarter
UGA Field goal, by Coutu, 52 yards. (9:36) 17-3 UGA
UGA Touchdown, 11-yard pass from Matthew Stafford to Sean Bailey, Coutu makes PAT. (8:05) 24-3 UGA

Third Quarter
UGA Fumble recovery, touchdown by Marcus Howard. Coutu makes PAT. (8:57) 31-3 UGA
UGA Touchdown, by Thomas Brown, 1-yard rush. Coutu makes PAT. (1:40) 38-3 UGA

Fourth Quarter
UGA Field goal, by Coutu, 45 yards. (14:37) 41-3 UGA
UH Touchdown, pass from Tyler Graunke to Ryan Grice-Mullen, 16 yards. PAT made by Dan Kelly. (10:38) 41-10 UGA

Aftermath
With Hawaii's defeat, the 2007-08 college football season ended with no undefeated teams, something that had not happened since the 2003-04 season.  This is also the second time in the BCS era that this has occurred.

Georgia DE Marcus Howard was named the MVP of the Sugar Bowl Game, the first time in its history that a purely defensive player has received the honor.

With the win, Georgia Head Coach Mark Richt became the first head coach in Georgia history to win more than one Sugar Bowl (his previous victory was over Florida State University following the 2002 season).  Vince Dooley and Wally Butts won one Sugar Bowl each, with Dooley's only win securing the 1980 National Championship.  Dooley lost four other Sugar Bowl games.

On January 8, Hawaii Head Coach June Jones left Hawaii to become the head coach at Southern Methodist University.  He signed a five-year contract.

References

Sugar Bowl
Sugar Bowl
Georgia Bulldogs football bowl games
Hawaii Rainbow Warriors football bowl games
2008 in sports in Louisiana
21st century in New Orleans
January 2008 sports events in the United States